T2 were an English progressive rock band, best known for their 1970 album, It'll All Work Out in Boomland. It is generally regarded as an excellent album.

Origins
T2 evolved from an earlier band, Neon Pearl, which was led by their drummer, Pete Dunton. Dunton was by 1968 a member of Please, which also included fellow Neon Pearl member Bernard Jinks. When that band broke up in 1969, due to Dunton's joining Gun alongside Adrian Gurvitz, Jinks became a member of Bulldog Breed.

Career
T2 was formed when Dunton reunited with bassist Jinks, and late period Bulldog Breed guitarist, Keith Cross. The trio played a form of psychedelic or proto-prog rock, which was similar in content to that played by the earlier bands its members had been in. T2 were formed and managed by John Morphew, who had previously managed Bulldog Breed; he financed the formation and successfully signed them to Decca for the then enormous sum of £10,000 in advance royalties and steered their path to what should have been a successful career. However, internal strife caused Morphew to give up on the band and leave them to their own devices.

Recording It'll All Work Out in Boomland, the trio played a series of successful dates, including an appearance on BBC 2 and returned to the studio to begin work on their follow-up. However, the number of LPs pressed was limited and associated publicity was poor, hence finding a copy in a record shop was difficult. (As a result, the rarity of the album meant that a mint copy of the LP some 20 years later would be quoted at around £200). In 1972, while recording material for their second album, T2 disbanded due to internal conflict. The breakup caused the unfinished album to be shelved until the early 1990s.

It'll All Work Out in Boomland was issued on CD format by the German label World Wide Records, remastered from the original recording tapes. However, apparently both the original mix down information and the original mix down tapes had been lost, and as a result there are some minor aural differences between the LP and CD versions. A South Korean label had previously issued the album on CD, but this was suspected to have been copied from an original vinyl pressing. The CD issue sparked a brief T2 reunion, but without Keith Cross. The band now consisted of Dunton, Jinks and Moore. T2 released Second Bite (1992), Waiting For The Band (1993) and On The Frontline (1994). By the time Waiting For The Band was released, Jinks had left the group and Moore had shifted to bass to accommodate their new guitarist, Ray Lee.

In 1992, the Swedish neo-prog band Landberk covered 'No More White Horses' on their album Lonely Land. Decca Records released box sets, Legend of a Mind (2003) and Strange Pleasures (2008). Each included a remastered track from It'll All Work Out in Boomland, respectively 'No More White Horses' and 'JLT'. The sound quality of both tracks is much superior to the World Wide Records issues.

Concurrent with the reformation of T2, an album of acetate demos recorded in 1970 was released in 1997.  Known initially as Fantasy and later issued simply as T2 or 1970, this album featured material written by the original lineup in the period after the release of It'll All Work Out In Boomland. In 2012, a third album of demos entitled 1971-1972 was released by Acme records, compiling material written and recorded by Dunton and a further succession of musicians, after Cross and Jinks had departed the lineup.

Discography 
1970: It'll All Work Out in Boomland	
1992: Second Bite	
1993: Waiting For The Band	
1994: On The Front Line
1997: Fantasy (aka T2 or 1970) - demos recorded in 1970
2012: 1971-1972 - demos recorded during the eponymous period

Albums under various formations
1967: Neon Pearl—As Neon Pearl 
1968: Complete Collection 65-68—As The Flies 
1969: Please 68-69—As Please (Released in 1998)
1969: Seeing Stars—As Please (Released in 2001)
1969: Made in England—As Bulldog Breed 
1972: Bored Civilians—As Keith Cross & Peter Ross

References

English art rock groups
English progressive rock groups
Musical groups established in 1970